Deltocephalinae is a subfamily of leafhoppers. Deltocephalinae is the largest subfamily in the family Cicadellidae and is divided into 40 tribes, comprising over 925 genera, and over 6,700 described species.

Tribes 
There are currently 40 described tribes within Deltocephalinae:

 Acinopterini Oman, 1943
 Acostemmini Evans, 1972
 Arrugadini Linnavuori, 1965
 Athysanini Van Duzee, 1892
 Bahitini Zahniser & Dietrich, 2013
 Bonaspeiini Zahniser & Dietrich, 2013
 Chiasmini Distant, 1908
 Cicadulini Van Duzee, 1892
 Cochlorhinini Oman, 1943
 Deltocephalini Dallas, 1870
 Dorycephalini Oman, 1943
 Drabescini Ishihara, 1953
 Drakensbergenini Linnavuori, 1979
 Equeefini Theron, 1986
 Eupelicini Sahlberg, 1871
 Faltalini Zahniser & Dietrich, 2010
 Fieberiellini Wagner, 1951
 Goniagnathini Wagner, 1951
 Hecalini Distant, 1908
 Hypacostemmini Linnavuori & Al-Ne’amy, 1983
 Koebeliini Baker, 1897
 Limotettigini Baker, 1915
 Luheriini Linnavuori, 1959
 Macrostelini Kirkaldy, 1906
 Magnentiini Linnavuori, 1978
 Mukariini Distant, 1908
 Occinirvanini Evans, 1966
 Opsiini Emeljanov, 1962
 Paralimnini Distant, 1908
 Pendarini Dmitriev, 2009
 Penthimiini Kirschbaum, 1868
 Phlepsiini Zahniser & Dietrich, 2013
 Punctulini 
 Scaphoideini Oman, 1943
 Scaphytopiini Oman, 1943
 Selenocephalini Fieber, 1872
 Stegelytrini Baker, 1915
 Stenometopiini Baker, 1923
 Tetartostylini Wagner, 1951
 Vartini Zahniser & Dietrich, 2013

References

External links
Deltocephalinae. bugguide.net